Stojan Vidakovič (born 30 November 1967) is a Slovenian windsurfer. He competed in the men's Lechner A-390 event at the 1992 Summer Olympics.

References

1967 births
Living people
Slovenian male sailors (sport)
Slovenian windsurfers
Olympic sailors of Slovenia
Sailors at the 1992 Summer Olympics – Lechner A-390
Sportspeople from Maribor
20th-century Slovenian people